Allqamarini (Aymara and Quechua allqamari "mountain caracara",-ni a suffix to indicate ownership, "the one with the mountain caracara", also spelled Alkamarini) is a mountain in the northern extensions of the Cordillera Real in the Andes of Bolivia which reaches a height of approximately . It is located in the La Paz Department, Larecaja Province, Sorata Municipality. It lies southwest of Quriwani. The small lake southeast of Allqamarini is Quriwani Machu.

References 

Mountains of La Paz Department (Bolivia)